The Basel–Rodersdorf railway line is a  railway line in Switzerland and France. It runs  from Rodersdorf, in the Swiss canton of Solothurn, to the border of Basel-Stadt, near the Basel Zoo, where it connects with the Basel tram network. The line crosses through the southern part of the French department of Haut-Rhin, serving the commune of Leymen. It was later electrified, and is now owned by Baselland Transport, which operates lines 10 and 17 of the Basel tram network over the line.

History 
The , founded in 1886, opened its initial line between Basel and Therwil on 4 October 1887. The line was extended another  to Flüh, on the border with Alsace (then part of the German Empire). The line between Basel and Flüh was electrified at 750 V DC on 2 June 1905; this was later raised to 940 V DC. A final  extension to Rodersdorf, crossing Alsace, opened on 1 May 1910.

Operation beyond Flüh was suspended between 1914–1915 by the outbreak of World War I. The postwar Treaty of Versailles restored Alsace to France. World War II and the German invasion of France led to the closure of the line a second time, between 1940–1945. , cross-border operation continues and Alsace remains part of France.

In 1974, the Birsigthalbahn-Gesellschaft merged with three other companies to form Baselland Transport. In 1984, the line's electrification was converted to 600 V DC to permit interoperation with the rest of the Basel tram network.

Route 

The line begins from a turning loop in Rodersdorf. It then runs east through Haut-Rhin, in Alsace, serving the commune of Leymen. Crossing back into Switzerland, it serves the municipalities of Bättwil, Witterswil, and Ettingen, and then turns north to follow the Birsig river. It serves the municipalities of Therwil, Oberwil, Bottmingen, and Binningen. The line then enters the city of Basel and serves the Basel Zoo, after which it connects with the Basel tram network.

Operation 

Baselland Transport operates two tram services over the line, Lines 10 and 17. Two trams operate every fifteen minutes to Ettingen via . Every other tram continues beyond Ettingen to Flüh or Rodersdorf. Line 17 provides additional week-day rush-hour service from Basel Wiesenplatz to Ettingen.

Notes

References 

 
 

Railway lines in France
Railway lines in Switzerland
Railway lines opened in 1887
1887 establishments in Switzerland
Baselland Transport lines
Metre gauge railways in France
Metre gauge railways in Switzerland
600 V DC railway electrification